Jalan Pantai Barat Kedah (Kedah State Route K1) is a major road in the Malaysian state of Kedah.  It connects Bedong, Kuala Muda to Kuala Kedah, Kota Setar, traversing paddy fields Yan to Kuala Kedah. The road travels along the west coast of Kedah and is alternate of Federal Route 1 and North–South Expressway Northern Route from Gurun to Alor Setar. Kilometer zero is located at Bedong, Kedah.

Junctions and towns

Roads in Kedah